Simon Van de Voorde  (born 19 December 1989) is a Belgian professional volleyball player. He was part of the Belgium national team at the 2014 World Championship held in Poland. At the professional club level, he plays for Axis Guibertin.

Honours

Clubs
 CEV Champions League 
  2015/2016 – with Diatec Trentino

 CEV Cup
  2016/2017 – with Diatec Trentino

 National championships
 2009/2010  Belgian SuperCup, with Noliko Maaseik
 2009/2010  Belgian Cup, with Noliko Maaseik
 2010/2011  Belgian Championship, with Noliko Maaseik
 2011/2012  Belgian SuperCup, with Noliko Maaseik
 2011/2012  Belgian Cup, with Noliko Maaseik
 2011/2012  Belgian Championship, with Noliko Maaseik
 2012/2013  Belgian SuperCup, with Noliko Maaseik

Individual awards
 2010: CEV Cup – Best Blocker

External links

 
 Player profile at LegaVolley.it 
 Player profile at Volleybox.net  

1989 births
Living people
Sportspeople from Leuven
Belgian men's volleyball players
Belgian expatriate sportspeople in Poland
Expatriate volleyball players in Poland
Belgian expatriate sportspeople in Italy
Expatriate volleyball players in Italy
Expatriate volleyball players in Iran
Jastrzębski Węgiel players
Trentino Volley players
Middle blockers